Helena Elisabeth "Lenie" de Nijs (April 1939 – 22 January 2023) was a Dutch swimmer. In July-August 1955 she broke three freestyle world records over 1500 m, 880 yd and 1760 yd distances. She then changed to backstroke, winning three national titles over 100 m (1956–1958) and setting world records in the 200 m backstroke (1957) and 4×100 m medley relay events (1956 and 1958); she set her last record while winning the European title in Budapest, together with Ada den Haan, Cocky Gastelaars and Atie Voorbij. She qualified for the 1956 Summer Olympics, but could not participate due to the boycott of those games by the Netherlands.

As a child, de Nijs was diagnosed with chronic asthma and bronchitis and the doctor advised her to join a sport club to improve health. After retiring from swimming she married the Dutch water polo player Harry Vriend on 4 October 1963. Her younger sister Judith was also a world-level swimmer.

De Nijs died on 22 January 2023, at the age of 83.

See also
 World record progression 200 metres backstroke
 World record progression 1500 metres freestyle

References

1939 births
2023 deaths
Dutch female backstroke swimmers
Dutch female freestyle swimmers
European Aquatics Championships medalists in swimming
World record setters in swimming
Sportspeople from Hilversum
20th-century Dutch women